Rigidoporus lineatus is a plant pathogen infecting plane trees.

References

Fungal tree pathogens and diseases
Meripilaceae
Fungi described in 1827
Taxa named by Christiaan Hendrik Persoon